Lambertus Jacobus Johannes "Bertus" Aafjes (May 12, 1914 – April 23, 1993) was a Dutch poet noteworthy for his poems about resistance to German occupation during World War II.

 was born in Amsterdam, married and was the father of 3 daughters and 1 son. He died in Venlo.

Aafjes wrote a five-book series featuring Japanese samurai Ōoka Tadasuke. His work is marked by his devout Catholicism, but he also scripted the comics Mannetje Bagatel (1946) and Kleine Isar, de Vierde Koning (1962) for Eppo Doeve
, as well as Peter-kersen-eter (1943) and De Vrolijke Vaderlandse Geschiedenis (1948) for Piet Worm.

Bibliography
 
 
 
 
 
  Aantekeningen bij zijn poëzie
 
 
 
 
 
 
 
 
 
 
 
 
 
 
 
 
 
 
 
 
 
 
 
 
 
 
 
 
 
 
 
 
 
 
 
 ëzie der oude Egyptenaren
 '
  Een reisboek over Italië
 
 
 
 
 
 
 
 
 
 
 
 
 
 
 
 
 
 
 
 , reisverslag
 
 
 
 
 
 
 
 
 
 
 
 
 
 
 
 
  ("Boekenweekgeschenk")
 
 
 
 
 
 
 
 
 
 
 
 
 
 
 
 
 
 , jeugdboek

References

External links 

1914 births
1993 deaths
20th-century Dutch poets
20th-century Dutch male writers
20th-century Dutch novelists
Catholic poets
Dutch Roman Catholics
Dutch comics writers
Dutch male novelists
Dutch male poets
Writers from Amsterdam